NGC 4643 is a lenticular galaxy located in the constellation Virgo. It is a member of the NGC 4753 Group of galaxies, which is a member of the Virgo II Groups, a series of galaxies and galaxy clusters strung out from the southern edge of the Virgo Supercluster.

References

External links 
 

Virgo (constellation)
4643
Barred lenticular galaxies
042797